Ilhéu de Santana is an uninhabited island in the Gulf of Guinea and is one of the smaller islands of São Tomé and Príncipe. It is 50 metres high. The islet was mentioned in the 1616 map by Jodocus Hondius as I. de S. Anne.

References

Santana
Cantagalo District